Red box or Redbox may refer to:

Art, entertainment, and media
 Red Box (band), a British band
 Redbox, a DVD rental service
 The Red Box, a book by Rex Stout
 "(Open Up the) Red Box", a song by Simply Red

Other uses
 Red-boxing American political campaign tactic 
 Red box (government), the red, wooden briefcases used by the British government and monarch
 Red box (phreaking), a phreaking device
 Eucalyptus polyanthemos, a tree species commonly known as red box
 Tornado watch, sometimes referred to as a "red box" by meteorologists and storm chasers
 Red Box, California, an unincorporated community in Los Angeles County, California, United States

See also
 Red telephone box